Pesonen is a Finnish surname. Notable people with the surname include:

 Matti Pesonen (1868-1957), Finnish educationist and politician
 Otto Pesonen (1868–1936), Finnish farmer and politician
 Armas Pesonen (1885-1947), Finnish javelin thrower
 Aarno Pesonen (1886–1927), Finnish educationist and politician
 Yrjö Pesonen (1888–1966), Finnish farmer, journalist, insurance executive and politician
 Dick Pesonen (born 1938), American football player
 Pentti Pesonen (born 1938), Finnish cross country skier
 Martti Pesonen, Finnish Grand Prix motorcycle road racer
 Jussi Pesonen (born 1960), Finnish businessman
 Jussi Pesonen (ice hockey) (born 1979), Finnish ice hockey player
 Janne Pesonen (born 1982), Finnish ice hockey player
 Saku Pesonen (born 1985), Finnish football player
 Harri Pesonen (born 1988), Finnish ice hockey player 
 Anssi Pesonen (born 1990), Finnish ice hockey goaltender

Finnish-language surnames